Marisa Acocella Marchetto (born 1962 in New Jersey) is an American cartoonist. She is the author of the New York Times best-selling graphic novel Ann Tenna, the graphic memoir Cancer Vixen, and Just Who the Hell is She, Anyway? She is also a cartoonist for The New Yorker and a columnist for W magazine's website. Her work has appeared in The New York Times, Glamour, and O, The Oprah Magazine.

Personal life
Marisa Marchetto was born in 1962, in New Jersey. She grew up in Scotch Plains, New Jersey, where she was one of four children. She currently lives in New York. Her father was a pharmacist, and her mother, Violetta, was a shoe designer. In her first drawings, Marchetto drew copies of her mother's shoe designs.

She attended the Pratt Institute in New York City, where she studied painting and eventually earned a degree from New York City's School of Visual Arts.

In 2004 she married former restaurant owner Silvano Marchetto. Three weeks before the wedding Marchetto was diagnosed with breast cancer. Despite her diagnosis, the wedding went as planned, and she began her treatments. She used her diagnosis of breast cancer as an inspiration for her popular graphic memoir Cancer Vixen. While undergoing chemotherapy, surgeries, and radiation treatments, she chose to refer to herself as a "cancer vixen" rather than a  "cancer victim." Marchetto drew about her life with breast cancer which eventually led to her popular graphic memoir Cancer Vixen.

Career
After Marchetto graduated from the Pratt Institute she went on to work as an art director at J. Walter Thompson, a major Madison Avenue agency. There she met colleague Robert Kirshenbuam. After working at J. Walter Thompson for four years, Marchetto and Kirshenbuam left and became founders of Kirshenbuam and Bond, a boutique ad agency. After a few years at the ad agency, Marchetto moved on to be a senior vice president at Young & Rubicam.

While at Young & Rubicam, Marchetto began to create a comic strip titled She. The heroine in the comic strip served as her alter ego, and in 1993 the strip became a regular feature in the women's magazine Mirabella. The cartoon strip followed the heroine with her struggles of what to wear and questioning her choices in life. Marchetto took a leave of absence from her job at Young & Rubicam to work on her graphic novel, Just Who the Hell is She, Anyway? The Autobiography of She, featuring the same character "She" from the Mirabella strip. After publishing Just Who the Hell is She, Anyway? in 1994, Marchetto never returned to her job at Young & Rubicam.

In the period 2000–2001, Acocella produced the semi-regular comics journalism strip The Strip for The New York Times, often on the topic of fashion.

In 2006 Knopf released Marchetto's graphic memoir, Cancer Vixen: A True Story, about her 2004-2005 battle with breast cancer. Details in the memoir include her seeking cancer treatment without health insurance, which she had allowed to lapse. Cancer Vixen was one of Times top ten graphic memoirs. Cancer Vixen was first published in Glamour magazine as a six-page cartoon. In 2006 released as a graphic memoir book which depicts a woman with cancer who chooses to live her life stylishly and fiercely, despite living with an illness. Marchetto's story is considered as a notable piece of literature in the breast cancer community. Her memoir has inspired the culture of not becoming a victim to breast cancer, but rather to be a "vixen." In 2013, HBO announced it was developing a Cancer Vixen film starring Cate Blanchett as Marisa Acocella Marchetto; as of 2020 the film is still in development.

Ann Tenna, released in September 2015 by Knopf, is a New York Times best-selling graphic novel about an influential gossip columnist who has a near-fatal accident. She is brought face-to-face with her higher self, who challenges her to change her life for the better. Marchetto has said that having a life-threatening breast cancer diagnosis informed the story arc of Ann Tenna.

Marchetto currently is a cartoonist for The New Yorker.

Charitable work
Marchetto has donated a portion of her Cancer Vixen royalties to the Breast Cancer Research Foundation and is the founder of The Cancer Vixen Fund, which has funded free mammograms for uninsured women in New York City. The renamed Marisa Acocella Marchetto Foundation funds free integrative therapies and free cold capping for women to prevent hair loss from chemotherapy at the Mount Sinai Dubin Breast Center and the Mount Sinai Beth Israel Comprehensive Cancer Center. The foundation also supports a complete empowerment program that includes yoga, Chi Qong, journaling, exercise, meditation, and nutrition. The Foundation's mission is "No breast left behind."

Bibliography

Comics journalism 
 "The Sporting Life: You're Going into the Knicks' Locker Room?!!," The New Yorker (November 22, 1999): 67-68.

The Strip 
 "Teen People Presents 'What's Next,'" The New York Times (November 19, 2000)
 "A book party for 'Dear Sisters' Dispatches from the Women's Liberation Movement," The New York Times (December 10, 2000): Style 3
 "Is the party over?," The New York Times (December 24, 2000): Style 3 
 "Outside Apt, a new nightclub on West 13th," The New York Times (January 21, 2001): Style 3
 "Susan Miller looked to the stars to predict trends during fashion week," The New York Times (February 4, 2001): Style 3
 "For Ling, a model but not a supermodel, Fashion Week is the most unglamorous week of the year," The New York Times (February 18, 2001): Style 3
 "Two parties for Elle Magazine's young collectors, a group interested in the crossover of art and fashion," The New York Times (March 4, 2001): Style 3
 "The International Beauty Show at the Javits Center where 500 companies brought their latest products," The New York Times (March 18, 2001): Style 3
 "A lunch at La Caravelle for 'longtime friends' of the restaurant, where models showed Chanel's spring 2001 collection," The New York Times (April 1, 2001): Style 3

Books 
  Just Who the Hell is She, Anyway? The Autobiography of She (Crown Books, 1994)
 Cancer Vixen: A True Story (Knopf, 2006)
 Ann Tenna (Knopf, 2015)

References

External links
 
 Cancer Vixen at Alfred A. Knopf website

American women cartoonists
American graphic novelists
American memoirists
American writers of Italian descent
The New Yorker people
People from New York City
People from Roselle Park, New Jersey
1960s births
Living people
American women memoirists
American women novelists
Novelists from New Jersey
Novelists from New York (state)
Female comics writers
School of Visual Arts alumni
American cartoonists
21st-century American women